Anna Ellen Baylis (born 16 December 1976) is an Australian cross-country mountain biker.

Baylis participated in the 2000 Summer Olympics in Sydney coming 21st in the women's cross-country event. She also represented Australia at the 2002 Commonwealth Games in Manchester and completed the Hawaii Ironman in 2010.

Bayliss completed a Bachelor of Applied Science (Human Movement) with honours in food science and nutrition at Deakin University. She is an accredited life coach, studying at the Coaching Institute to gain her credential in practitioner of coaching, along with becoming qualified emotional intimacy coach. In addition, Baylis is a Neuro Linguistic Programming (NLP) Coach and Time Line Therapy Practitioner and has certification training in Hypnotherapy and Chakra Therapy. As a Mind Body Coach she incorporates movement, nutrition, emotional healing and mindset to guide her clients to optimum health and well-being.

References

External links 

 Official website

Living people
1976 births
Australian female cyclists
Olympic cyclists of Australia
Cyclists at the 2000 Summer Olympics
Australian mountain bikers